State Trunk Highway 152 (often called Highway 152, STH-152 or WIS 152) is a state highway in the U.S. state of Wisconsin. It runs in east–west in east-central Wisconsin from Wautoma to Mount Morris.

Route description
The highway begins at the intersection of Townline Road and East Main Street (WI 73/WI 21) in Wautoma. It continues north for a short distance before turning right at East Mount Morris Avenue and continuing east from its intersection with North Townline Road. The route continues northeast through the town of Wautoma before running northward and terminating at county highways G and W in the community of Mount Morris.

Major intersections

See also

References

External links

152
Transportation in Waushara County, Wisconsin